Guo Wei Zhong is a paralympic athlete from China competing mainly in category F42 high and long jump events.

Guo Wei Zhong has competed in both the 2000 and 2004 Summer Paralympics, on both occasion he competed in the long jump and won silver in the high jump.

References

External links
 

Paralympic athletes of China
Athletes (track and field) at the 2000 Summer Paralympics
Athletes (track and field) at the 2004 Summer Paralympics
Paralympic silver medalists for China
Living people
Medalists at the 2000 Summer Paralympics
Medalists at the 2004 Summer Paralympics
Year of birth missing (living people)
Paralympic medalists in athletics (track and field)
Chinese male long jumpers
Chinese male high jumpers
21st-century Chinese people